Michael Paul may refer to:

Michael Paul (athlete) (born 1957), Trinidad and Tobago athlete
Michael Paul (handballer) (born 1961), German handball player
Mike Paul (born 1945), baseball player
 Michael F. Paul (author) (born 1972), American Fiction Writer